Secrets of Beauty (also titled Why Men Leave Home) is a 1951 American drama film directed by Erle C. Kenton and starring Ern Westmore, Julie Bishop, Richard Denning. The film was released on DVD in 2006.

Cast
Julie Bishop as Ruth Waldron
Richard Denning as Dr. John Waldron
Ginger Prince as Ginger Waldron
Ern Westmore as Himself
Norma Gilchrist as Herself
Virginia Herrick as Betty Westmore
Larry Blake as Uncle Marty
Jo-Carroll Dennison as Herself
Myrna Dell as Kay Joyce
Jonnie Lee Macfadden as Jonnie Lee
Arthur Lee Simpkins as Himself

References

External links

1951 drama films
1951 films
Films directed by Erle C. Kenton
1950s English-language films
1950s American films